Vesey is an English surname. Notable people with the surname include:

Agmondisham Vesey (1677-1739) Irish landowner and politician
Agmondesham Vesey (1708-85) Irish politician and amateur architect
Denmark Vesey (c. 1767–1822), American rebel slave
Elizabeth Vesey (1750–1791), English socialite and writer
Gerald Vesey (1832–1915), English clergyman
Ivo Vesey (1876–1975), British Army officer
Jim Vesey (born 1965), American ice hockey player
Jimmy Vesey (born 1993), American ice hockey player
John Vesey (c. 1462–1554), English bishop
William Vesey (1674–1746), American clergyman

See also
Sutton Vesey (ward), Sutton Coldfield, Birmingham
Vesey Street (Manhattan)
de Vesci and Viscount de Vesci

English-language surnames